David Wilde (born 1935 in Manchester) is an English pianist and composer. As a boy he studied with Solomon and his pupil Franz Reizenstein, who had also studied composition with Hindemith and Vaughan Williams.

A frequent soloist at the Henry Wood Proms, working with such conductors as Horenstein, Boulez, and Downes, he shared with Jacqueline du Pré the honour of opening the BBC's second TV Channel in the North of England with Sir John Barbirolli and the Hallé Orchestra in 1962, and was a soloist at the Royal Concert the same year.

During the 1990s he composed many works protesting against human rights abuses in our time and was twice honoured by the city of Sarajevo. "The Cellist of Sarajevo", (1992) dedicated to Vedran Smailovic, was recorded by Yo-Yo Ma for Sony Classical, and the opera London Under Siege, after an idea by Bosnian poet Goran Simic, was produced by the State Theatre of Lower Saxony in 1998.

As a pianist Wilde has won several major prizes, including a first at the Liszt-Bartók competition in Budapest in 1961. The legendary Nadia Boulanger was a jury member and invited him to Paris for further study.  "Mademoiselle", as she liked to be called, described him as "Superb performer, magnificent musician", and DW remained in close touch with her for the rest of her long life.

Recordings include all the Sonatas for violin and piano by Beethoven with Erich Gruenberg; the Sonata for violin and piano by his teacher Reizenstein, also with Gruenberg; the Concerto by Thomas Wilson (specially composed for him); and works by Schumann, Liszt, and Chopin. He has recorded for HMV, Decca Oiseau Lyre, Lyrita Saga and CRD, and now records exclusively for Delphian Records of Edinburgh, who have already issued a recordings of music by Dallapiccola, Busoni, and Liszt, Schumann and Brahms. A Beethoven recital is due to be issued in 2010.

DW was Professor of Piano at the Music Academy in Hannover from 1981 to 2000, and since his return to the UK in 2001 has been Visiting Professor in Keyboard Studies at the University of Edinburgh.

References

External links
 Wilde Plays Chopin at the Wigmore Hall DCD34010
 The Cellist of Sarajevo (Tutti Celli)

English classical pianists
Male classical pianists
English composers
People educated at Arnold School
1935 births
Living people
Musicians from Manchester
Academics of the University of Edinburgh
21st-century classical pianists
21st-century British male musicians